Guzerat can refer to:
 An alternate spelling for Gujarat
 Guzerat cattle
 Guzerá of Brazil,  cross-bred from Indian Kankrej cattle
 Kankrej of Gujarat